Alex Allen Waimora is a Solomon Islands international football player. Formerly a member of Three Kings in the New Zealand ASB Youth League. He has played for Solomon Islands U14&U15 Futsal Team in 2009 and 2010. He later played in 2011 edition of the Oceania FIFA U17 World Cup Qualifiers for Solomon Islands. He has made 1 appearance for the Solomon Islands national football team. 
Currently, Alex Waimora is out due to a serious Knee injury and have been recovering for 1 year now. Expected date of return is 2017 for the FIFA OFC MEN'S WORLD CUP QUALIFIERS.

References

Living people
1994 births
Solomon Islands footballers
Solomon Islands international footballers
Solomon Islands men's futsal players
Association football midfielders
Association football forwards